Sam Hill (born 1 July 1993) is a rugby union player for Sale Sharks in the Premiership Rugby. He made his Premiership debut against Wasps playing for Exeter Chiefs on 28 January 2012 and he plays as a centre.

Club career
Hill attended Cheriton Bishop Primary School before moving on to Queen Elizabeths Community College in Crediton. Having played for Crediton RFC until the age of 15, Sam gained selection for England under 16s and moved to Ivybridge College sixth form for two years.

Hill spent the early years of his professional career dual-registered with Cornish Pirates to aid his player development.

Hill has been a regular for England juniors going back to his try scoring debut against the Namibia invitational XV.
Hill has also recently been selected to play for England Saxons gaining one cap prompting a call up to England's pre-tour training squad to New Zealand.

On 13 March 2020, Hill left Exeter Chiefs to join Premiership rivals Sale Sharks on a two-year deal from the 2020–21 season.

International career
Hill received his first call up to the senior England squad by new coach Eddie Jones on 13 January 2016 for the 2016 Six Nations Championship.

References

External links
 Exeter Player Profile

1993 births
Living people
English rugby union players
Exeter Chiefs players
Rugby union players from Exeter
People from Crediton
Sale Sharks players